Mamun Imdadul Haque Chawdhury is an All India United Democratic Front politician from Assam. He was elected in Assam Legislative Assembly election in 2016 from Naoboicha constituency.Ex. MLA of AIUDF Choudhury has officially joined Aam Aadmi Party on 16 May 2022 in Guwahati.

References 

Living people
All India United Democratic Front politicians
People from Dhubri district
Assam MLAs 2016–2021
Year of birth missing (living people)